Terrebonne, meaning good earth in French, is a name of several places in North America:

Canada
Terrebonne, Quebec, a suburb of Montreal
Terrebonne station, a commuter railway station in Terrebonne, Quebec
Terrebonne City Council, the governing body for Terrebonne, Quebec
Terrebonne County, Quebec, a historical county in Quebec
Terrebonne (electoral district), a Quebec federal electoral district
Terrebonne (provincial electoral district), a Quebec provincial electoral district
Terrebonne—Blainville, a former Quebec federal electoral district

United States
Terrebonne, Minnesota, a former village site in Red Lake County
Terrebonne, Oregon, a census-designated place notable for its proximity to Smith Rock State Park
Terrebonne Parish, Louisiana
Terrebonne Township, Red Lake County, Minnesota